Mildred High School is a 3A high school located in Mildred, Texas (USA). It is part of the Mildred Independent School District located in southeastern Navarro County.  Even though the school is located near Mildred, Texas, it is often, however inaccurately referred to as, Corsicana Mildred.  In 2011, the school was rated "Academically Acceptable" by the Texas Education Agency.

UIL Academics

Speech and Debate 
The Mildred Speech and Debate Team currently participates in UIL, NSDA, and TFA.

UIL Academic Success:
 State Champions: Cross-Examination Debate - 2017(3A), State Speech Team Championship - 2016(3A), Prose Interpretation - 2015(3A)
 State Runners-up: Informative Extemporaneous Speaking - 2017(3A), Informative Extemporaneous Speaking - 2016(3A)
 State Bronze Medalists: Student Congress - 2015(3A) and 2017(3A), Cross-Examination Debate - 2016(3A)
 State Medalists: Informative Extemporaneous Speaking 4th Place - 2016(3A), Cross-Examination Debate - 2015(3A)
TFA State:

Mildred Speech and debate qualified a Cross-Examination debate team for the TFA State meet in 2017.

Athletics
The Mildred Eagles compete in the following sports:

Cross Country, Volleyball, Football, Basketball, Powerlifting, Golf, Track, Softball & Baseball

State Runners-up:  Baseball - 1995(1A), 2008(2A)

State Runners-up: Football - 2012 (2A)

References

External links
Mildred ISD
Mildred Athletics

Schools in Navarro County, Texas
Public high schools in Texas
Public middle schools in Texas